Yeot is a variety of hangwa, or Korean traditional confectionery. It can be made in either liquid or solid form, as a syrup, taffy, or candy. Yeot is made from steamed rice, glutinous rice, glutinous sorghum, corn, sweet potatoes, or mixed grains. It is presumed to have been used before the Goryeo period. The steamed ingredients are lightly fermented and boiled in a large pot called a sot (솥) for a long time.

Yeot boiled for a shorter time is called jocheong (조청), liquid yeot. This sticky syrup-like jocheong is usually used as a condiment for cooking and for coating other hangwa, or as a dipping sauce for garae tteok, white cylindrical tteok.

If boiled for a longer time, the yeot will solidify when chilled, and is called gaeng yeot (갱엿). Gaeng yeot is originally brownish but if stretched (as taffy is prepared), the color lightens. Pan-fried beans, nuts, sesame, sunflower seeds, walnuts, or pumpkin can be added into or covered over the yeot as it chills. Variations of yeot are named for their secondary ingredients, as follows.

Types
Ssallyeot (쌀엿) – made from rice
Hobakyeot (호박엿) – made with pumpkin, local specialty of Ulleungdo
Hwanggollyeot (황골엿) – made from a mixture of rice, corn, and malt.
Kkaeyeot (깨엿) – covered with kkae (깨, sesame)
Dangnyeot (닭엿) – local specialty of Jeju Island, made with glutinous millet and chicken
Kkwongnyeot (꿩엿) – local specialty of Jeju Island, made with glutinous millet and pheasant meat
Dwaejigogiyeot (돼지고기엿) – local specialty of Jeju Island, made with glutinous millet and pork
Haneuraegiyeot (하늘애기엿) – local specialty of Jeju Island, made with glutinous millet and haneulaegi herb
Boriyeot (보리엿) – local specialty of Jeju Island, made with barley
Maneullyeot (마늘엿) – local specialty of Jeju Island, made with glutinous millet and garlic
Gochgamyeot (곶감엿) – local specialty of Sangju, made with dried persimmons
Yakyeot (약엿) – made with sesame, walnut, ginger, jujube. It was used as a tonic for sick people. 
Tongoksusu (통옥수수엿) - made from corn sprouted.

The word yeot as slang
In modern times, the Korean phrase "eat yeot" (엿 먹어라) has a vulgar meaning, comparable to using the words "fuck you" in English. The phrase originated from the middle-school entry exams scandal of 1964. One of the multiple choice questions asked in the exam: "Which of the following ingredients can be used instead of yeot oil (엿기름; barley malt) to make yeot?" The correct answer was diastase, but another one of the multiple choices was mu juice, which many people argued was also a correct answer. The parents of the students whose grades suffered from this result held demonstrations and protests in front of government education bureaus and offices, holding up yeot made with mu juice and yelling to the officials to "eat yeot".

The phallic shape of raw yeot had also led the candy to be used as a euphemism for penis as early as the sixteenth century.

Gallery

See also
 Hahngwa
 List of syrups
 Rice syrup

References

External links

Brief information about yeot 
Article regarding Ulleungdo hobak yeot

Hangwa
Confectionery
Syrup